On High is the third album by Canadian singer-songwriter Kate Maki, released on February 12, 2008, in the USA on Howe Gelb's record label OW OM Records and in Canada on Kate's label Confusion Unlimited.

The album's lead single, "Blue Morning", was highlighted as a "Song of the Day" by NPR, KCRW, and WXPN.

The song "To Please" was featured in the film Ingenious from 2009, and the song "Highway" was featured in Episode 9 of the television series Hard Rock Medical in 2013.

Track listing
 "Highway" 
 "Blue Morning" 
 "Wanted Ads"
 "White Noise" 
 "To Please"
 "Message Forgot"
 "Badminton Racquet"
 "Beyond the Sun"
 "We Are Gone"
 "Don't Look Down"
 "On a String"

References

2008 albums
Kate Maki albums